Snyder Creek is a stream in the U.S. state of Iowa. It is a tributary to the Iowa River.

Snyder Creek was named after W. B. Snyder, a pioneer settler.

References

Rivers of Johnson County, Iowa
Rivers of Iowa